Farnham Church is a historic Episcopal church located at Farnham, Richmond County, Virginia. It was built in 1737, and is a one-story, cruciform shaped brick Colonial era church building.  It measures 63 feet, 8 inches, feet by 58 feet, 2 inches, and is topped by a gable roof. Two years into the War of 1812, bullet holes were left in the walls during a conflict between the Virginia militia and the British fleet, led by Admiral  George Cockburn. This event was called the Skirmish at Farnham Church. During the Civil War the church was used by Union soldiers as a stable.  The church was last renovated in 1921 in the Georgian Revival style.

It was added to the National Register of Historic Places in 1973.

References

External links

Farnham Church (Episcopal), State Routes 602 & 607, Farnham, Richmond, VA: 1 photo at Historic American Buildings Survey

Historic American Buildings Survey in Virginia
18th-century Episcopal church buildings
Churches on the National Register of Historic Places in Virginia
Episcopal churches in Virginia
Churches completed in 1737
Colonial architecture in Virginia
Georgian Revival architecture in Virginia
Buildings and structures in Richmond County, Virginia
National Register of Historic Places in Richmond County, Virginia